Mount Pleasant is a cricket ground in Batley, West Yorkshire. The first recorded match on the ground was in 1869, when Batley played Burnley.  The ground hosted a single first-class match in 1883 when the T. Emmett's XI played R. G. Barlow's XI.

The ground, adjacent to the stadium of Batley RLFC, is the home of Batley Cricket Club. They are members of the Central Yorkshire Cricket League.

References

External links
Mount Pleasant on CricketArchive
Mount Pleasant on Cricinfo

Cricket grounds in West Yorkshire
Sports venues completed in 1869
1869 establishments in England
Batley